The Pueblo Chieftain is an American daily newspaper published in Pueblo, Colorado.

The Chieftain was established in 1868 by Dr. Michael Beshoar, the first doctor in Trinidad, Colorado. Wilbur Fisk Stone and George A. Hinsdale were the first two editors.

In May 2018, the paper was sold to GateHouse Media. In November 2019, New Media Investment Group, the successor to GateHouse Media, acquired newspaper publisher Gannett. The two companies merged and will operate under the Gannett brand.

Subsidiary papers include Pueblo Events and The Pueblo West View.

References

External links 
Pueblo Chieftain website

Gannett publications
Mass media in Pueblo, Colorado
Newspapers published in Colorado
1868 establishments in Colorado Territory